Major-General Petrus Jacobs  (1910-1967) was a South African military commander.

Military career 
He joined the South African Army as a part-time Citizen Force soldier in 1931 in the Prince Alfred's Guard and later became a full-time Permanent Force member.  He served in World War II with the 2nd South African Division and with Wits Rifles in Italy.

Maj Gen Jacobs was Army Chief of Staff from 1963 to 1965.

Awards and decorations

See also
List of South African military chiefs
South African Army

References 

1910 births
1967 deaths
White South African people
South African military personnel of World War II
Chiefs of the South African Army